Lower Wekiva River Preserve State Park is an  Florida State Park located on six miles (10 km) of the St. Johns River in Lake and Seminole counties. The park forms a wildlife corridor to the Ocala National Forest along the Wekiva and St. Johns Rivers.

Fauna
Among the wildlife of the park are black bears, river otters, alligators, wood storks, and sandhill cranes.

The park
There are two sections to the park, north and south. The northern section's entrance is in Pine Lakes, off S.R. 44. This entrance leads to the multiuse trails, primitive horse camping and backpack camping areas. The entrance to the southern section, off S.R. 46 nine miles (14 km) west of Sanford, provides access to 5,000 acres (2,000 ha) of the park. There is no horseback riding in this part of the park.

Neither section provides water access. Although canoeists can travel the Wekiva River through the park, they must launch from outside.

Recreational activities
Activities include equestrian camping, biking, canoeing, hiking, and wildlife viewing. Amenities include horse stalls and corrals and 18 miles (29 km) of multiuse trails.

Hours
Florida state parks are open between 8 a.m. and sundown every day of the year (including holidays).

Gallery

References and external links
 Lower Wekiva River Preserve State Park at Florida State Parks
 Lower Wekiva River State Preserve at State Parks
 Lower Wekiva River State Preserve at Absolutely Florida
 Lower Wekiva River State Preserve at Wildernet

State parks of Florida
Parks in Lake County, Florida
Parks in Seminole County, Florida